Nitchaon Jindapol (born 31 March 1991) is a Thai badminton singles player. She was a member of the national women's team which finished as runners-up at the 2010 Asian Games. She graduated at the Sripatum University with a Bachelor of Business Administration.

Achievements

Southeast Asian Games 
Women's singles

BWF World Tour (1 title) 
The BWF World Tour, which was announced on 19 March 2017 and implemented in 2018, is a series of elite badminton tournaments sanctioned by the Badminton World Federation (BWF). The BWF World Tours are divided into levels of World Tour Finals, Super 1000, Super 750, Super 500, Super 300, and the BWF Tour Super 100.

Women's singles

BWF Grand Prix (3 titles, 2 runners-up) 
The BWF Grand Prix had two levels, the Grand Prix and Grand Prix Gold. It was a series of badminton tournaments sanctioned by the Badminton World Federation (BWF) and played between 2007 and 2017.

Women's singles

  BWF Grand Prix Gold tournament
  BWF Grand Prix tournament

BWF International Challenge/Series (4 titles) 
Women's singles

  BWF International Challenge tournament
  BWF International Series tournament

Career overview 

 ''* Statistics were last updated on 18 February 2020.

Performance timeline

Record against selected opponents 
Record against year-end Finals finalists, World Championships semi finalists, and Olympic quarter finalists. Accurate as of 18 February 2020.

References 

1991 births
Living people
Nitchaon Jindapol
Nitchaon Jindapol
Badminton players at the 2010 Asian Games
Badminton players at the 2014 Asian Games
Badminton players at the 2018 Asian Games
Nitchaon Jindapol
Nitchaon Jindapol
Asian Games medalists in badminton
Medalists at the 2010 Asian Games
Medalists at the 2018 Asian Games
Competitors at the 2011 Southeast Asian Games
Competitors at the 2013 Southeast Asian Games
Competitors at the 2015 Southeast Asian Games
Competitors at the 2017 Southeast Asian Games
Competitors at the 2019 Southeast Asian Games
Nitchaon Jindapol
Nitchaon Jindapol
Southeast Asian Games medalists in badminton
Universiade bronze medalists for Thailand
Universiade medalists in badminton
Medalists at the 2011 Summer Universiade
Nitchaon Jindapol